Onneca Sánchez of Pamplona (died June 931) was Queen consort of León as the wife of Alfonso IV of León. She was the mother of Ordoño IV of León, and the daughter of Sancho I of Pamplona.

References 

931 deaths
Spanish royalty